The discography of Mark Lanegan consists of eleven studio albums and two EPs as a solo artist, and many other releases from collaborations with other artists.

After working with the Screaming Trees since the early 1980s Lanegan left the band due to internal strife over its creative direction. He released his first solo album The Winding Sheet, in 1990 on Sub Pop Recordings where he collaborated with Kurt Cobain on the track "Down in the Dark". His second record, Whiskey for the Holy Ghost, was released on January 12, 1994. Lanegan released Scraps at Midnight which was his first album to chart and it peaked at 191 on the UK Albums Chart. In 2000 Lanegan guested on Rated R by Queens of the Stone Age, a band which he had become a full-time member of in 2001. In 2003 Lanegan started working with Greg Dulli as The Gutter Twins. They would release their debut album in 2008 which peaked at 117 on the Billboard 200; the highest placement for a Lanegan record. Lanegan recorded his sixth album, Bubblegum, in 2004; it became his first solo album to chart in the United States. He released the album under the name Mark Lanegan Band. In 2006, Lanegan released Ballad of the Broken Seas with Isobel Campbell, which was nominated for a Mercury Music Prize. This was followed by Sunday at Devil Dirt, released in 2008, and Hawk, released on August 17, 2010.

Albums

Studio albums

Compilations

With Duke Garwood

With Isobel Campbell

With Skeleton Joe

Extended plays 

I Appeared on the UK Budget Albums Chart at number 35.

Singles

Music videos

Collaborations and contributions

References
General

  
 

Specific

External links 
 [ Mark Lanegan] at Allmusic
 

Discographies of American artists
Rock music discographies